Monhaupt is a German surname. Notable people with the surname include:

 Ernst Monhaupt (1775–1835), Prussian lieutenant general
 Louise Monhaupt (1836–1918), German stage actress

See also
 Mohaupt
 Mohnhaupt

German-language surnames